Vidya Sagar Gupta is an Indian politician and member of the Bharatiya Janata Party. Gupta was a member of the Uttar Pradesh Legislative Assembly from the Lucknow East constituency in Lucknow district.mr gupta was a mla for a consecutive 3 terms from 1996 to 2012 although the BJP could not form its government but gupta kept winning.later in 2019 in the yogi adityanath led bjp government he was nominated as a chairman in the board of technical education U.P for a term of 3 years also having the status of a minister of state [MOS].

References 

Politicians from Lucknow
Bharatiya Janata Party politicians from Uttar Pradesh
Members of the Uttar Pradesh Legislative Assembly
Living people
21st-century Indian politicians
Year of birth missing (living people)